{{Infobox television
| image                    = This Is A Logo For LazyTown.jpg
| image_size               = 200
| caption                  = Title card
| alt_name                 = LazyTown Action Time! (US/CAN)
| genre                    = Live action
| creator                  = Magnús Scheving
| based_on                 = {{based_on|LazyTown}}
| creative_director        = 
| starring                 = Ronald BinionMagnús SchevingJodi EichelbergerGuðmundur Þór KárasonStefán Karl StefánssonSarah BurgessLorraine ParsloeDavid Matthew FeldmanJulie WestwoodCaroline DaltonJulianna Rose Mauriello  Jackson Elton
| country                  = United KingdomIceland
| language                 = English
| num_series               = 1
| num_episodes             = 26
| executive_producer       = Magnús SchevingMagnús Ragnarsson
| producer                 = Julian Essex-Spurrier
| editor                   = Kimberly Pena
| runtime                  = 12-14 minutes
| company                  = LazyTown EntertainmentBBC Scotland
| distributor              = BBC Worldwide (United Kingdom)LazyTown Entertainment (Overseas)
| network                  = CBeebies
| picture_format           = 16:9
| audio_format             = Dolby Digital
| first_aired              = 
| last_aired               = 
| related                  = LazyTown}}LazyTown Extra (also known in other countries as LazyTown: Action Time!) is a British children's television series produced by LazyTown Entertainment, based on the original LazyTown series, functioning as a spin-off. It first aired on 15 September 2008, showing on the BBC's CBeebies, along with the original series.

SynopsisLazyTown Extra is formatted as a sketch show featuring the LazyTown characters in an assortment of short sketches, with the main focus being on Ziggy, as he travels to various parts of the United Kingdom looking at many different athletic activities.

Segments
 Super Moves - Sportacus showcases a move the viewer can do at home.
 Ziggy's Introduction - Ziggy lands somewhere in the United Kingdom and introduces the episode's topic to the audience.
 LazyTown's Big News - Mayor Milford and Bessie Busybody give out a fact in relation to the episode's topic. (Odd-numbered episodes).
 Trixie and Stephanie - Set within Mayor Milford's house, Stephanie teaches Trixie something. (Even-numbered episodes)
 Meeting the Children - Ziggy meets two or three children and confuses the episode's topic for something he enjoys.
 Stephanie's Moves - Stephanie teaches the audience how to do dance moves to a LazyTown song.
 Big Activity - Ziggy watches the children doing the topic, sometimes doing it himself. Instrumentals of LazyTown songs play in the backgrounds.
 Stingy and Milford - Set at Mayor Milford's house or the Town Hall, Stingy complains about a topic, while Mayor Milford teaches him advice that Stingy can take the other way. (Appears after the Big Activity in odd-number episodes and the Children meeting in even-numbered episodes
 Sportacus' Moves - Set within the LazyTown Sports Hall, Sportacus teaches a group of children wearing Sports Clothes how to do a move together. (Even-numbered episodes)
 Ziggy's Questions - Ziggy asks questions to the children about the episode's topic.
 Sportacus Challenge - Pixel sets Sportacus with an athletic challenge. (Odd-numbered episodes)
 Robbie's World Records - Robbie Rotten attempts to do a world record in relation to the episode's topic, to disastrous results. (Even-numbered episodes)
 Ziggy's Goodbye' - Ziggy says goodbye to the viewers, and the episode then ends.

In the LazyTown Action Time! version, the Ziggy segments are shorter and are set on a white screen, voiced by his original voice actor.

Cast
Despite being produced for the UK market (as the series was semi-redubbed for the UK market), only Lorraine Parsloe reprises her role as Ziggy, due to his segments being produced in the United Kingdom itself. The original American voice actors for the puppets reprise their voice roles in the series. However, in the Action Time! version, Guðmundur Þór Kárason reprises as Ziggy.

Live Actors
 Magnús Scheving as Sportacus 
 Stefán Karl Stefánsson as Robbie Rotten
 Julianna Rose Mauriello as Stephanie

 Puppets 
 Lorraine Parsloe as the voice of Ziggy
 Guðmundur Þór Kárason as the voice of Ziggy (Action Time!'' version)
 Jodi Eichelberger as Stingy
 Sarah Burgess as Trixie and Ziggy (Puppeteer)
 Ronald Binion as Pixel 
 David Matthew Feldman as Mayor Milford Meanswell
 Julie Westwood as Bessie Busybody and Ziggy (Puppeteer)

Other
 Caroline Dalton as the Airship Voice
 Antonía Lárusdóttir, Anita Rós Þorsteinsdóttir, Fjóla Brynjarsdottir, Rachel Hilson and Isis Mullen-Hansen as Dancers

Episodes

Production
The show was filmed in Spring & Summer 2008.

See also

References

External links

2008 British television series debuts
2008 British television series endings
2000s British children's television series
2000s British television sketch shows
British children's comedy television series
British children's musical television series
British preschool education television series
British television spin-offs
British television shows featuring puppetry
British television series with live action and animation
2000s preschool education television series
Children's sketch comedy
CBeebies
LazyTown
English-language television shows